Chojeniec  is a village in the administrative district of Gmina Siedliszcze, within Chełm County, Lublin Voivodeship, in eastern Poland.

The village has a population of 340.

References

Villages in Chełm County